Gabriel Ste-Marie  is a Canadian politician and academic who was elected to represent the riding Joliette in the House of Commons in the 2015 election. He teaches economics at Cégep régional de Lanaudière.

Ste-Marie served as the Bloc Québécois House Leader (and its parliamentary leader as the party leader did not have a seat in parliament) from 2017 until he resigned from the position on February 25, 2018 in a dispute with party leader Martine Ouellet. He, along with six other Bloc MPs, resigned from the Bloc's caucus to sit as an independent MP on February 28, 2018 citing conflicts with the leadership style of Martine Ouellet. He rejoined the Bloc Québécois caucus on September 17, 2018.

He is also a researcher at the Contemporary Economics Research Institute and lecturer at Université du Québec à Montréal.

Electoral record

References

External links

Living people
Bloc Québécois MPs
Members of the House of Commons of Canada from Quebec
People from Joliette
Canadian economists
Academic staff of the Université du Québec à Montréal
21st-century Canadian politicians
Québec debout MPs
Year of birth missing (living people)

L'Action